Ovidiu Ilie Morariu (born 18 July 1989) is a Romanian professional footballer who plays as a defender.

Honours
CSA Steaua București
Liga III: 2020–21
Liga IV: 2019–20

External links
 
 

1989 births
Living people
Sportspeople from Alba Iulia
Romanian footballers
Association football defenders
CS Național Sebiș players
Liga I players
Liga II players
Liga III players
AFC Chindia Târgoviște players
ACS Foresta Suceava players
ASC Daco-Getica București players
CSA Steaua București footballers
Romanian expatriate footballers
Romanian expatriate sportspeople in Germany
Expatriate footballers in Germany